This list of giant squid specimens and sightings since 2015 is a timeline of recent human encounters with members of the genus Architeuthis, popularly known as giant squid. It includes animals that were caught by fishermen, found washed ashore, recovered (in whole or in part) from sperm whales and other predatory species, as well as those reliably sighted at sea. The list also covers specimens incorrectly assigned to the genus Architeuthis in original descriptions or later publications.

Background 

The 15-month period between January 2014 and March 2015 saw an unprecedented mass appearance event in the Sea of Japan, during which 57 giant squid specimens were recorded in Japanese coastal waters (spanning #563 to 631) and a substantial but smaller number from the South Korean side. The dramatic increase in strandings during this time has been attributed to unusually low sea temperatures. Nevertheless, specimens often go unreported by Japanese fishermen as their largely inedible flesh means they have a low market value.

Though the frequency with which specimens are observed has increased in recent decades, the giant squid remains a highly elusive animal, especially given its large size and worldwide distribution. Specimen records continue to be compiled and tallied by workers in the field, both regionally and on a global level, with individual specimens regularly receiving scholarly papers unto themselves. As Roper et al. (2015:83) wrote: "Few events in the natural world stimulate more excitement and curiosity among scientists and laymen alike than the discovery of a specimen of Architeuthis."

List of giant squid 

 Misidentification (non-architeuthid)  Record encompassing multiple specimens  Photographed or filmed while alive

Specimen images 
The following images relate to giant squid specimens and sightings since 2015. The number below each image corresponds to that given in the List of giant squid table and is linked to the relevant record therein. The date on which the specimen was first documented is also given (the little-endian day/month/year date format is used throughout).

Notes

References

Short citations

Full citations

A

B

C

D

E

F

G

H

I

J

K

L

M

N

O

P

R

S

T

U

W

X

Y

Z

Author unknown 

 
  
 
 
 
 
 
 
 
  
  
 
  
  
 
 
 
 
 
 
 
 
 
 
 
 
 
 
 
 
 
 
 
 
 
 
 
 
 
 
 
 
 
 
 
 
 
 
 
 
 
 
 
 
 
 
 
 
 
 
 
 
 
  
 
 
 
 
 
 
 
 
 
 
 
 
 
 
 
 
  
 
 
 
 
 

Giant squid
Lists of animal specimens
21st century-related lists